Gari Cappelli (born 16 May 1961) is a Croatian politician who had served as the Minister of Tourism in the Cabinet of Andrej Plenković from 2016 to 2020. He also served as mayor of Mali Lošinj between 2005 and 2016.

Early life 
Cappelli was born on 16 May 1961 in Mali Lošinj in a family with origins from Padua, Italy.

Political career 
Cappelli joined HDZ in 1992 and soon became the head of Mali Lošinj's HDZ town committee and started work in the county party committee. In 1999, due to his perfect knowledge of the Italian language, he was posted at the Croatian Consulate General in the Italian city of Trieste, where he was in charge of economic co-operation.

In 2005, Cappelli is running for Mayor of Mali Lošinj and has been performing for the third term for this position.

From 19 October 2016 to 23 July 2020, Cappelli served as the 13th Minister of Tourism, in the Cabinet of Andrej Plenković. He succeeded Anton Kliman.

External links
 Gari Cappelli at gov.hr 

living people
1961 births
Croatian Democratic Union politicians
Croatian diplomats
Dalmatian Italians
Tourism ministers of Croatia
People from Mali Lošinj
Representatives in the modern Croatian Parliament